Lake Charlotte is a rural cottage community on the Eastern Shore of the Halifax Regional Municipality, Nova Scotia, Canada. The community is located on the junction of Trunk 7 and Clam Harbour Road, 58.23 kilometers from Downtown Halifax.

Lake

Lake Charlotte, also known as Lac Charlotte (French) is a lake for which the community is named, is a relatively deep lake by Nova Scotian standards. Reaching a maximum depth of 48 meters in the deepest point, and with many areas of the north half featuring depths in excess of 20 meters, it is deeper than Kejimkujik Lake, Nova Scotia's largest natural lake, and Lake Ainslie, Nova Scotia's second largest lake. The lake is popular with recreational boaters, as well, during the summer months.

Communications 
 The postal code is B0J 2L0.
 The telephone exchange is 902  845 -Aliant;

Demographics 
 Total population – 821
 Total dwellings  – 389
 Total businesses – 15
 Total land area  – 108.259 km2

Attractions 
There is a  provincial park reserve at Lake Charlotte that offers backcountry hiking and camping, carry-in and boat launch potential and winter recreation. It was acquired by the Province of Nova Scotia in the mid-1970s as part of its commitment to establish an Eastern Shore Seaside Park System.

There is also a Memory Lane Heritage Village Museum in Lake Charlotte.

References

Communities in Halifax, Nova Scotia
General Service Areas in Nova Scotia